Creigiau Gleision is a mountain in Snowdonia, Wales, near Capel Curig. It is the easternmost of the high Carneddau and is separated from the others by Llyn Cowlyd. Directly across this reservoir from Creigiau Gleision is Pen Llithrig y Wrach. To the north-east it runs into the broad ridge of Cefn Cyfarwydd.

Creigiau Gleision affords splendid views in all directions, including northwards to the coast, and down the Ogwen Valley and Dyffryn Mymbyr towards Snowdon.

In fact the mountain has three peaks, hence perhaps its plural name. Between these two lie a middle peak, of a height between the outer two, but cairnless and unmarked on the O.S. map.

Colin Adams, author of The Mountain Walker's Guide to Wales (Gwasg Carreg Gwalch, 2002), has reached the summit of Creigiau Gleision over 450 times. He claims that on many occasions he encountered a ghost there who has spoken to him, and although he makes no reference to this in his book, he wrote about it in 1999.

External links
www.geograph.co.uk : photos of Creigiau Gleision and surrounding area

References

Marilyns of Wales
Mountains and hills of Snowdonia
Hewitts of Wales
Nuttalls
Mountains and hills of Conwy County Borough
Trefriw